Albiorix (Gaulish god) is a deity often associated with the god Mars.

Name 
The origin of the name Albiorix is based on connection with the deity Mars, and as such the cult of this deity was known in the Haute-Provence and in the Alps. 

Scholars disagree with this being an individual deity or one that has been connected with Mars through syncretism and interpretatio.

The name of one of the moons of Saturn was named after this deity.

Attestations 
The inscription from the Corpus Inscriptionum Latinarum (CIL) includes references to the deity:

ALBIORICE

While also connected to the deity Mars found on fragments of vases:

MARTI

ALBIORIGI

References 

Gaulish gods